The Lily River is a river in central Madagascar. It is the main outflow of Lake Itasy, and flows northwestward to join the Sakay River, a tributary of the Tsiribihina. 

The upper stretch of the river is in Itasy Region. The lower stretch of the river forms the boundary between Itasy Region on the north and Bongolava Region on the south.

References

Rivers of Madagascar
Itasy Region
Rivers of Bongolava
Tsiribihina River